Tom Beeri (born 17 May 1986 in Yagur) is an Israeli swimmer who represented Israel at the 2008 Summer Olympics.

Biography
Be'eri was born and raised in Kibbutz Yagur, Israel. He won multiple Israeli National Champion titles  in the 100 meter Breaststroke and the 200 meter Breaststroke. Upon completing mandatory military service, he set an Israeli national record and qualified for the 2008 Summer Olympic Games in Beijing, China. He also served as the Israeli Olympic swim team captain and set two Israeli national records at the Games. 

After the Olympic Games, Be’eri was recruited by many of the top collegiate swimming programs in the U.S. before becoming a student-athlete at the University of Georgia in 2009. As a collegiate swimmer, he represented the UGA swimming and diving team at SEC championships and at the NCAA national championships. As a student he earned and was recognized for four Athletic Director’s academic awards as well as four SEC academic awards. In 2013, Be'eri graduated with a dual degree in International Affairs-Political Economy and Business Administration.

He competed on behalf of Israel at the 2008 Summer Olympics in Beijing, China. He is Jewish.

See also
List of Israeli records in swimming

References

External links
 

1986 births
Living people
Israeli male swimmers
Olympic swimmers of Israel
Swimmers at the 2008 Summer Olympics
Maccabiah Games medalists in swimming
Maccabiah Games gold medalists for Israel
Maccabiah Games silver medalists for Israel
People from Yagur
Jewish swimmers
Israeli Jews
Israeli people of Norwegian descent